The canton of Auvillar is a French former administrative division in the department of Tarn-et-Garonne and region Midi-Pyrénées. It had 4,896 inhabitants (2012). It was disbanded following the French canton reorganisation which came into effect in March 2015. It consisted of 10 communes, which joined the canton of Garonne-Lomagne-Brulhois in 2015.

The canton comprised the following communes:

 Auvillar
 Bardigues
 Donzac
 Dunes
 Merles
 Le Pin
 Saint-Cirice
 Saint-Loup
 Saint-Michel
 Sistels

References

Auvillar
2015 disestablishments in France
States and territories disestablished in 2015